The Australian Intelligence Medal (AIM) is a civil decoration awarded to national intelligence community members for distinguished service. The decoration was introduced on 24 January 2020. Recipients of the Australian Intelligence Medal are entitled to use the post-nominal letters "AIM".

Awards are made by the Governor-General, on the nomination of the Australian Intelligence Medal Committee.  The total number of awards made each year must not exceed the following quota:
 One medal for every 1000 members, or part of 1000 members plus one additional medal.

Description
The medal is a bi-metal construction of nickel-silver in antique finish and bronze colouring in a circular shape 38 millimetres in diameter. The obverse of the medal features a raised Federation Star. The centre of the Federation Star has a bronze-coloured raised impression of a decagon, symbolising the ten agencies of the National Intelligence Community. The Federation Star is surrounded by an indented border, representing the twenty-four-hour nature of intelligence. The central emblem is encircled by a contemporary laurel of a wattle which recalls the uniquely Australian nature of the award. The reverse features a border with the raised, polished words ‘Australian Intelligence Medal’ surrounding a space where the recipient's name may be engraved.

See also
 Australian Honours Order of Precedence

References

External links

Civil awards and decorations of Australia
2020 establishments in Australia
Awards established in 2020
Long and Meritorious Service Medals of Britain and the Commonwealth